The 1970 U.S. Professional Indoor was a WCT tennis tournament played on indoor carpet courts. It was played at the Spectrum in Philadelphia, Pennsylvania in the United States. It was the third edition of the tournament and was held from February 2 through February 8, 1970. First-seeded Rod Laver won his second consecutive singles title at the event.

Finals

Singles

 Rod Laver defeated  Tony Roche 6–3, 8–6, 6–2 
 It was Laver's 1st title of the year and the 12th of his professional career.

Doubles

 Ilie Năstase /  Ion Ţiriac defeated  Arthur Ashe /  Dennis Ralston 6–4, 6–3
 It was Nastase's 1st title of the year and the 2nd of his professional career. It was Tiriac's 1st title of the year and the 1st of his professional career.

References

U.S. Professional Indoor
U.S. Pro Indoor
U.S. Professional Indoor
U.S. Professional Indoor
U.S. Professional Indoor